Keep in Style is a 1934 Fleischer Studios animated short film starring Betty Boop.

Plot
Betty holds a "Betty Boop Exposition", where she displays the latest modern inventions. Her creations included an ultra-streamlined car, a roadster with multiple rumble seats (for those with a large family), a multi-level baby carriage for quintuplets, and a grand piano that can change into other useful contraptions. Her final invention is her dress, which can change into a flower, a butterfly, and a high-collared gown with a train. The dress is a sensation, and soon everyone is wearing the latest Boop creation.

References

External links
 Keep in Style at the Big Cartoon Database.
 Keep in Style on YouTube.
 

1934 films
Betty Boop cartoons
1930s American animated films
American black-and-white films
1934 animated films
Paramount Pictures short films
Fleischer Studios short films
Short films directed by Dave Fleischer